The 2020–21 Colorado State Rams men's basketball team represented Colorado State University during the 2020–21 NCAA Division I men's basketball season. The team was coached by Niko Medved in his third season. The Rams played their home games at Moby Arena on CSU's main campus in Fort Collins, Colorado as members of the Mountain West Conference. They finished the season 20-8, 14-4 to finish in 3rd place. They defeated Fresno State in the quarterfinals of the Mountain West tournament before losing in the semifinals to Utah State. They received an invitation to the NIT where they defeated Buffalo and NC State to advance to the semifinals where they lost to Memphis. They played the third-place game where they lost to Louisiana Tech.

Previous season

The Rams finished the 2019–20 season 20–12, 11–7 in Mountain West play to finish in a tie for fifth place. They lost in the first round of the Mountain West tournament to Wyoming.

Offseason

Departures

2020 Recruiting Class

Roster

Schedule and results

|-
!colspan=9 style=| Regular season

 

|-
!colspan=9 style=| Mountain West tournament

|-
!colspan=9 style=| NIT

Source

Notable games

Regular season
January 2, 2021 at Viejas Arena: Colorado State came back from a 26-point deficit to beat San Diego State 70–67, the largest comeback in Mountain West history.

2021 Mountain West tournament

Quarterfinals: March 11, 2021 at Thomas & Mack Center: No. 3 seed Colorado State beat No. 6 seed Fresno State 72–62 in the quarterfinals of the 2021 Mountain West Conference men's basketball tournament.
Semifinals: March 12, 2021 at Thomas & Mack Center: No. 3 seed Colorado State was beaten by No. 2 seed Utah State 62–50 in the semifinals of the tournament. Utah State would continue on to lose to San Diego State in the tournament championship.

2021 National Invitation Tournament (NIT)

First round: March 19, 2021 at UNT Coliseum: No. 1 seed Colorado State beat No. 4 seed Buffalo 75–73 on a game-winning layup by Isaiah Stevens in the first round of the National Invitation Tournament.
Quarterfinals: March 25, 2021 at Comerica Center: No. 1 seed Colorado State beat No. 3 seed NC State 65–61. Isaiah Stevens led scoring for the Rams, recording 18 points on 6 of 13 shots and four free throws.
Semifinals: March 27, 2021 at Comerica Center: No. 1 seed Colorado State was beaten by No. 1 seed Memphis, 90–67. Memphis would continue on to win the 2021 National Invitation Tournament.
Third-place game: March 28, 2021 at Comerica Center: No. 1 seed Colorado State was beaten by No. 4 seed Louisiana Tech 76–74 on a buzzer beater shot by Louisiana Tech star Kenneth Lofton Jr.

References

Colorado State Rams men's basketball seasons
Colorado State
Colorado State Rams
Colorado State Rams
Colorado State